Public Netbase was a cultural media initiative, open access internet platform, media art space, and advocate for the development of electronic art.

Early development
Public Netbase was founded by Konrad Becker and Francisco de Sousa Webber in Vienna's Messepalast (later renamed to Museumsquartier) in 1994 as a non-profit internet provider and a platform for the participatory use and critical analyses of information and communication technology. Its parent organization was the Institute for New Culture Technologies-t0, founded in 1993.  Most of the Institute's activities after 1994 occurred through Public Netbase, leading to the names and establishment dates being loosely applied, even in the organization's official material. The name of its World Wide Web server, t0, was often appended to either name as well. During the first years of its existence, Public Netbase shared a space in Museumsquartier with the initiative Depot – Kunst und Diskussion. After it relocated to own rooms (also in Museumsquartier), the number of workshops and instruction courses increased and the program of discursive events was now realized on an almost daily basis.

Art, culture, philosophy

Public Netbase focused on aiding the development of electronic art and the impact of the nascent World Wide Web on culture.  Its own online presence earned it an award for distinction at the Prix Ars Electronica in 1995.  Much of the web space provided through Public Netbase supported Austrian artists, although some hosted projects, such as the Transformation Story Archive, had wider recognition.  The physical location in the Museumsquartier was also used for sponsored events, ranging from art symposia to a conference of the Association of Autonomous Astronauts to a "lecture/performance/event" by Critical Art Ensemble about biotechnology and a number of conferences/exhibitions such as ROBOTRONIKA (1998) and SYNWORLD (1999).

Controversy

Austrian Freedom Party
The project increasingly came into conflict with the Austrian political establishment during the 1990s. When the right-wing Austrian Freedom Party (FPÖ) and its leader Jörg Haider began to rise in power in Austria, Public Netbase took an increasingly political activist role while facing increasing government pressure.  Haider accused Public Netbase of sponsoring child pornography and conflated Christina Göstl's hosted erotic art with a commercial porn site run from the British Virgin Islands during a speech in parliament.  Meanwhile, Public Netbase sponsored a "virtual alternative to Austria's far right government" that offered Austrian Web Resistance Awards to web sites dedicated to opposing Haider's government.

Decline and end of the project
The organization's lease at the Viennese Museumsquartier was not renewed after the entire cultural area was remodelled in the early 2000s, and it faced a series of audits and other bureaucratic challenges. Financial difficulties and an inability to secure a permanent replacement location could not be resolved. Despite a reorganization effort in 2005 that shortened its name to Netbase, the City of Vienna stopped all funding effective January 11, 2006, leading to the immediate shut down of the organization. The City of Vienna justified this decision with the changing needs in the Viennese net culture scene. The official funding agency wanted to find a new approach to supporting internet art and electronic culture in Vienna, rather than supporting one major institution, Public Netbase, with almost the entire net culture budget.

Legacy and recognition
The Institute for Applied Autonomy, recipient of an award for distinction in interactive art at the Prix Ars Electronica 2000, dedicated their award to Public Netbase for its political efforts.

In the early 2000s, World-information.org was launched. It can be described as "an ongoing effort to critically observe and investigate new technologies in a societal, economic and artistic context" led to involvement with the UNESCO Digi-Arts program and a series of conventions across Europe.

Although the Institute for New Culture Technologies-t0 doesn't run its own art center anymore, it is still active: Its projects are now mainly conducted through World-Information.Org and World-Information Institute. Since 2002 it has also been organizing Austria's prominent online "polling booth" wahlkabine.at

List of events

Workshops / small events
Public Netbase organized conferences, exhibitions, websites on a regular basis. Information can be found in the book Public Netbase: Non Stop Future as well as in an activity report which was compiled in 2004 and is available online.

Association of Autonomous Astronauts: Intergalactic Conference (1997)
Behind the rather dadaistic format of an 'intergalactic conference' that refers to an independent community based space program, one can find a critical discussion of the accessibility of new technologies and of current politics of space.

Infobody Attack (1997)
This series of events which took place in October 1997 critically analyzed topics related to surveillance and control in information societies.

Flesh Machine: A Genexploitation Project (1997)
This project questioning the "bio-technological revolution" was developed by the US-based artist collective Critical Art Ensemble in co-operation with Public Netbase. Visitors had the possibility to take actual screening tests for donor DNA and find out "if they were considered 'fit' or 'unfit' for reproduction in a pan capitalist society." Amongst others, Let's Make Baby!, "an illustrated guide for children that explains how science and medicine create life and why", was available.

Information Terror (1998)
In the course of this co-operation with The Society of the Unknown (London) a freight container – installed in front of Vienna's opera house – was "transformed into a psychogeographical feedback device".

Robotronika (1998)
In this five-day event, which mainly consisted of a symposium and an exhibition, current developments in robotics and automatization were presented and critically analyzed.

Period After (1998/99)
Period After was "focusing on the long term development in the Balkan region, related to media, contemporary culture and the potential and real consequences of the ongoing crisis." Main part of the project and prerequisite for other activities was the development of a network of media initiatives in South Eastern Europe.

Synworld playwork:hyperspace (1999)
Synworld was one of Public Netbase's most comprehensive events in the 1990s. It focused on relations between popular games and developments of scientific and social relevance. The multifaceted program included lectures, installations, multimedia presentations, game stations and a lounge.

Kultur.Netz.2000+ (1999)
This is one example out of a field of activities in which Public Netbase engaged continuously: fostering self-organization in the field of independent media initiatives in Austria in order to voice their interests and concerns, and to influence the development of cultural and media policies. Meetings were organized, lists of demands collectively formulated, and attempts werde made to raise awareness on a broader scale.

European Cultural Backbone / ECB (1999-2003)
European Cultural Backbone was "a coalition of mediacultural institutions and individuals working together to creatively use and develop participatory media for social change".

fremd.netz (1999)
This anti-racist project was conducted in a time when the Austrian federal government formed which for the first time included Jörg Haider's right-wing Freedom Party (FPÖ). The project took place in an underground station in Vienna and included, amongst others, Franz Xaver's media installation "Fremdsteuerung", several lectures as well as presentations of initiatives like Period After and the newly formed platform Get to Attack.

government-austria.at (2000/2001)
This website represented a discursive context that "explicitly refused any dialogue with the ÖVP-FPÖ government and instead of that tried to develop its own identity".

free.netbase.org (2000-2004) 
This website documented the political pressure which Austria's right-wing government exerted on Public Netbase, and the latter's resistance. free.netbase.org served also as a platform to organize and make visible the broad international solidarity with Public Netbase.

Interface Explorer (2001)
Interface Explorer presented current trends in the design of new interfaces and web browsers. Projects by international artists were presented and a forum for the discussion of current trends was provided. The exhibition was co-curated by Johannes Grenzfurthner. One of the highlights was a lecture by Lev Manovich who had just published his book The Language of New Media.

Basecamp (2001/2002)
Under this title, three installations in public space (inside and in front of Vienna's Museumsquartier) were installed, each presenting a media project: a virtual billboard in "Remote Viewing", the SMS project "Text-FM" and the music project "Remote Jam".

free:re:public (2001-2004)
"Sound-politicization" was one of the new terms which emerged in the course of the protests against the Austrian right-wing government. In free:re:public this belief in the political potential of sound was put into practice in the form of huge youth cultural protest demonstrations that were organized once a year in Vienna.

Dark Markets (2002)
This strategic conference examined current relations between media politics, information technologies and political theories of democracy. Central questions for the conference were: "Has the Internet still its original potential to foster a 'network democracy from below'? Aren't new media already too much compromised by the ever growing state and corporate influence? Can the Internet be reclaimed as a 'digital commons' or has the current crisis already reached a meta media level, beyond propaganda and its mirror counter-campaigns?"

Campaign against the violation of data protection (2003)
Public Netbase took part in this campaign launched by the "European Digital Civil Right" network and staged a protest at Vienna Airport. Passengers were informed that, as a consequence of a new EU directive, they were "facing the risk of their personal data, including credit card number and religious affiliation, being transferred to the US authorities without their knowledge".

Open Cultures (2003)
Open Cultures comprised a two days conference, workshops and an exhibition. It focused on politics of the infosphere and on inventive approaches to advance a "free flow of information".

Demokratie und Öffentlichkeit in der Informationsgesellschaft (2003) 
A few days after the World Summit on the Information Society (WSIS) had taken place in Geneva, it was critically analyzed in two events organized by Public Netbase.

Free Media Camp (2003)
The Free Media Camp aimed at raising public awareness about the extremely precarious situation of independent and participatory media initiatives in Vienna. The camp was established in public space at Vienna Karlsplatz and lasted for almost four months. In sum approximately 100 events (discussions, presentations, music events, screenings...) took place. The camp was organized by Public Netbase in co-operation with local cultural and media initiatives: Malmoe, IG Kultur Wien, Radio Orange 94.0 and Public Voice Lab.http://www.nettime.org/Lists-Archives/rohrpost-0306/msg00177.html (in German). Retrieved 2013-09-12

Nikeground (2003)
This communication guerrilla project, which was developed and conducted in co-operation with 0100101110101101.ORG, criticized the accelerating commercialization of public space. Faked announcements informed that Karlsplatz, one of Vienna's historical squares, was going to be renamed to "Nikeplatz" and that as part of this process a 36 meter high monument in form of the Nike-logo would be erected. A two-story glass pavilion located on the square informed about the alleged plans and served as a highly visible sign in public space. The project led to discussions in the arts and cultural scene. At the same time it was sufficiently plausible and spectacular to trigger various forms of citizens' protests and a broad media coverage.

Kein Asylverfahren im World Wide Web! (2003/2004) 
This ant-racist project was developed in response to the aggravation of Austria's asylum policies as a consequence of the politics of the ÖVP-FPÖ government. Workshops were conducted in which young asylum seekers had the possibility to acquire and further develop media competencies.

S-77CCR - System 77 Civil Counter-Reconnaissance (2004)
S-77CCR critically examined surveillance technologies and played with the idea of providing civil society with its own tools to observe and control public space. "Top-down surveillance for grassroots initiatives!" (Brian Holmes)

Art != Bioterrorism (2004)
After the artist and researcher Steve Kurtz, founding member of Critical Art Ensemble, had been arrested by the FBI and faced "an indictment based on laws that severely curtail fundamental rights using the fight against terrorism as a pretext", Public Netbase organized solidarity- and protest events in Vienna.

Free Bitflows (2004)
Free Bitflows continued the format of major events combining conference, workshops and exhibition. It was an "exploratory event focusing on the politics of info streams to advance free flows of information".

Austria 2005
In the year 2005 several Austrian anniversaries coincided: sixty years after the end of World War II, fifty years of Austrian State Treaty and 10 years of Austria's EU membership. 2005 was officially declared a 'jubilee year' and Public Netbase launched a "range of political and cultural events [...] against the engines of jubilation, [that] will facilitate debates on the various jubilee topics from different emancipatory perspectives." The website "Austria 2005: A protection kit against a year of homeland celebrations"  was a central space for these projects. Public Netbase's tradition of communication guerilla projects was continued in the four communiques of the "Combat Resistance Cells"

Raubkopieren macht impotent! (2005/2006)
This communication guerilla project was developed in response to an anti-piracy campaign which was launched by the German film industry. Amongst others, a faked press conference was organized in Vienna's main shopping street: The launch of a similar anti-piracy campaign in Austria was announced and people accused of offenses like "having sent copyrighted ringtones to a friend" were provided to the pillory.

Publications about Public Netbase
 Clemens Apprich / Felix Stalder (Ed.): Vergessene Zukunft. Radikale Netzkulturen in Europa, Bielefeld (transcript) 2012, 
 Branka Ćurčić / Zoran Pantelić / New Media Center_kuda.org (Ed.): Public Netbase: Non Stop Future - New Practices in Art and Media, Frankfurt a. M. (Revolver) 2008,  (Hardcover)
 Josephine Bosma: Constructing Media Spaces. The novelty of net(worked) art was and is all about access and engagement, in: Media Art Net, 2004, URL: 
 Martin Wassermair: Culture and Deviation. Artistic dissidence in Austria, in: Umělec magazine 2009/2, URL:

External links
Public Netbase
Institute for New Culture Technologies
Future Non Stop (archive)

References

Contemporary art organizations
Internet culture
Internet service providers
Culture jamming techniques
Politics and technology
Political art
Digital art
Internet-based activism